Péter János Zwack (21 May 1927 – 5 August 2012) was a Hungarian businessman, investor, philanthropist, diplomat and the Hungarian Ambassador to the United States from 1990 until 1991. He was the CEO and owner of the company Zwack.

Biography

In emigration
Zwack was born into a prominent family which owned the Zwack PLC. During World War II Budapest and the Zwack factory were completely destroyed. After the war, in 1948 the new Communist regime nationalized the factory. The Zwack family fled the country. János Zwack with his son Péter, great grandson of József Zwack, the founder of the factory, was able to escape with the original Zwack recipe in his pocket. Béla Zwack remained behind to give the communist government a "fake" Zwack recipe and went on to become a regular factory worker.

Meanwhile, János and Péter migrated to the United States and after several months in Ellis Island's refugee camp were granted US entry purely because they possessed the Zwack recipe. They later settled in the Bronx in 1949 when Péter was 22 years old. It was in the U.S. that Péter learned all the ins and outs of the spirits industry.

Together with Tibor Eckhardt he founded a charity named First Aid for Hungary in 1956 which helped the refugees of the Hungarian Revolution of 1956.

Political career in Hungary
Zwack became chairman of the Entrepreneurs' Party in 1992. Two years later he made an electoral alliance with SZDSZ, Fidesz and the Agrarian Alliance, according to which he was the joint candidate of the four parties in Kecskemét during the 1994 Hungarian parliamentary election. He won a seat to the National Assembly of Hungary as the only independent MP. He resigned from his party leader position in 1995. Between 1995 and 1997 he was a member of the Kossuth Prize and Széchenyi Prize Committee.

During the 1998 Hungarian parliamentary election he was supported by SZDSZ but he did not repeat his success four years ago. After that he joined to SZDSZ. In 1999 he became a member of the party's leadership. He was one of the party's chargé d'affaires from 2000 to 2003. In 2002 he was elected to a member of the parliament again but he resigned half years later.

Death
Zwack died in Italy on 5 August 2012 at the age of 85. The family business continues on led by his two youngest children, Sándor and Izabella.

Personal life
First he married in 1953. His wife was Iris Rogers. Together they had six children: Peter (1954), Gioia (1956), Alexa (1959), Iris (1961) and John (1965). This marriage lasted until 1969. His second wife was Anne Marshall. They married in 1973 and had together a son and a daughter: Sándor (1974) and Izabella (1976).

References

External links
The Washington Diplomat Newspaper - Ambassador profile
MTI Ki Kicsoda 2009, Magyar Távirati Iroda Zrt., Budapest, 2008, 1225. old., ISSN 1787-288X
Zwack Péter életrajza
Zwack Péter 1996-os parlamenti életrajza
Zwack Péter országgyűlési adatlapja

1927 births
2012 deaths
Alliance of Free Democrats politicians
Hungarian diplomats
Hungarian emigrants to the United States
Hungarian businesspeople
Ambassadors of Hungary to the United States
Members of the National Assembly of Hungary (1994–1998)
Members of the National Assembly of Hungary (2002–2006)